The Cunggel is a mountain of the Plessur Alps, overlooking St. Peter in the canton of Graubünden. It lies on the range between the valleys of Schanfigg and Prättigau at a height of 2,413 metres.

References

External links
 Cunggel on Hikr

Mountains of the Alps
Mountains of Switzerland
Mountains of Graubünden
Two-thousanders of Switzerland